Nina Dudnik is an American social entrepreneur, science diplomacy advocate, and the Founder and former CEO of Seeding Labs, a US-based nonprofit organization investing in building scientific capacity in the developing world. Dudnik founded the organization in 2003 as a graduate student studying at Harvard University, where she received her PhD in molecular biology.

Education and early career 
Dudnik received her Bachelors of Science in biochemistry from Brown University. Between college and graduate school, she worked in agricultural development as a consultant for CGIAR (Consultative Group for International Agricultural Research) in Italy, and then became a Fulbright scholar in Cote d’Ivoire. After her year in Africa, she returned to the United States to attend Harvard University, where she received her PhD in molecular biology. She did her doctoral work in the laboratory of Dr. Kami Ahmad, where she ultimately published her dissertation, "Histone dimers on the move: Nucleosome assembly systems for H2A and H2AV in Drosophila."

Global development work 
Dudnik had personally felt the effects of lack of access to scientific resources in developing countries when doing her Fulbright work in Côte d'Ivoire, where she was working to breed better varieties of rice. There, she saw a gap between a wealth of scientific talent and a dearth of access to research equipment to put that talent to use. When she returned to the United States to pursue her doctoral degree, she worked to bridge that gap. She led a group of fellow students in collecting surplus biological equipment and supplies at Harvard University to send to labs in developing countries to support the research they were doing at their local institutions. This effort became the basis of Seeding Labs, which formally launched in 2007 when Dudnik was awarded the Echoing Green fellowship. A year later, Seeding Labs was established as a 501(c)3 nonprofit organization in 2008.

Dudnik and her team  expanded Seeding Labs beyond equipment transfer, developing exchange programs to train scientists from developing countries in America. She  promoted the organization's vision as a TEDGlobal Fellow, a PopTech Social Innovation Fellow, and at the World Economic Forum. They have received funding and support from a combination of government organizations like the United States Agency for International Development, academic institutions like Harvard University, and multinational corporations like Merck.

Science advocacy efforts 
Dudnik has written on the need to build scientific capacity in developing countries to take on the world's most pressing health challenges for outlets like Scientific American, Time, and Quartz, drawing attention to the lack of funding and research support for countries in the global South. After the 2014 Ebola outbreak in West Africa, she published an op-ed for the Wall Street Journal underscoring the need to support developing scientific talent within Africa, which could have enabled earlier public health mobilization on the ground and prevented a wider Ebola outbreak without reliance on Western aid.

A woman in science herself, Dudnik has also written on issues of diversity, equity, and inclusion in STEM fields. She is currently an Advisory Board member for the grassroots nonprofit 500 Women Scientists, which is working to make science open, inclusive, and accessible by promoting women scientists in leadership.

Awards and honors 

Echoing Green Global Fellow, 2007
TEDGlobal Fellow, 2010
 PopTech Social Innovation Fellow, 2010
Elle's Inspirational Women, The Fixers, 2011
 John F. Kennedy New Frontier Award, 2014
 Scientific American's 100 Most Influential People in Biotechnology, 2015
New England Biolabs Passion in Science Humanitarian Duty Award, 2016
Boston Business Journal Innovation All Star, 2017

References 

Year of birth missing (living people)
Living people
American women chief executives
Social entrepreneurs
American women biochemists
Harvard Graduate School of Arts and Sciences alumni
Brown University alumni
American nonprofit chief executives
Women science writers
21st-century American women